The Plague Dogs is the third novel by Richard Adams, author of Watership Down, about the friendship of two dogs that escape an animal testing facility and are subsequently pursued by both the government and the media. It was first published in 1977, and features a few location maps drawn by Alfred Wainwright, a fellwalker and author. The conclusion of the book involves two real-life characters, Adams' long-time friend Ronald Lockley, and the world-famous naturalist Sir Peter Scott.  Having seen a manuscript, both men readily agreed to be identified with the characters and opinions that Adams had attributed to them, as is shown in Adams' preface to the book.

Plot
This book tells of the escape of two dogs, Rowf and Snitter, from a government research station in the Lake District in England, where they had been horribly mistreated. They live on their own with help from a red fox, or "tod", who speaks to them in a Geordie dialect. After the starving dogs attack some sheep on the fells, they are reported as ferocious man-eating monsters by an opportunistic journalist. A great dog hunt follows, which is later intensified with the fear that the dogs could be carriers of a dangerous bioweapon, such as the bubonic plague.

Basis in reality
Adams stated in the book's introduction that "There is no such place in the Lake District as Animal Research (Scientific and Experimental). In reality, no single testing or experimental station would cover so wide a range of work as Animal Research. However, every 'experiment' described is one which has actually been carried out on animals somewhere."  
The actual location of "ARSE" (an acronym for Animal Research, Scientific and Experimental, and British slang for buttocks) was based on the remote hill farm of Lawson Park, now run as an artist residence by the contemporary art organisation Grizedale Arts.

Characters
Rowf: A shaggy, large black mongrel, born in the laboratory where inhumane experiments were performed on him and his companion, Snitter. Snitter escapes with Rowf, only to find that living in the great outdoors is quite challenging. Rowf is a downtrodden fellow, quite cynical and increasingly feral in his ways, since he has had a hard life and never met a decent human. As a result of the experimentation, he has gained an abnormal fear of water. Toward the end of his travels, his time with Snitter and his encounter with real-life naturalists Peter Scott and Ronald Lockley has him believing humankind may not be irredeemably bad.

Snitter: A black and white (white, chocolate and tan in the film) fox terrier. Unlike his friend, Rowf, Snitter was once settled into a home. After he lost his master in a road accident with a truck, he was sold to the laboratory by his master's sister. The scientists in the lab have performed numerous brain surgeries on Snitter, merging his conscious and subconscious mind. This causes him to have nightmarish flashes and dreams at random times, whether he is asleep or awake (similar to Fiver from Watership Down). Frequently, he hallucinates the sight of his master approaching, and turns round in joyful greeting, only to find there is no one there. Once he and Rowf escape the lab, Snitter is determined to find another home for himself and his friend. Snitter is the most hopeful character in the book, and the most mysterious, since he can have several strange ramblings concerning his condition and past events. While he and Rowf are swimming out to sea, he has a horrifying vision of a man torturing and killing all the animals of the world, including some the existence of which he could not possibly know about, such as whales.

The Tod: A red fox encountered by Snitter and Rowf early in the story. He speaks in the dialect of Upper Tyneside, having been born "far ahint th' Cross Fell". He forges an uneasy friendship with the dogs, teaching them hunting and survival skills in return for a share of the kill. The friendship is stronger with Snitter, who understands both the Tod's speech and his mode of thought. Rowf, by contrast, "can't understand a word he says," distrusts his "sly, sneaking" ways, and believes that the Tod is taking advantage of his strength to provide himself with easy meals in return for advice without which Rowf feels he and Snitter would be better off. For a while the trio survive reasonably comfortably, the dogs killing sheep and fowls under the Tod's guidance, but eventually the dogs' indiscreet ways drive him away, which together with the onset of winter marks the start of a much tougher phase of the dogs' fight for survival. In the book, when Rowf drives him away, the Tod meets Snitter whilst being pursued by a local foxhunt. As the pack of foxhounds closes in on the Tod, he tells Snitter to run, giving him a final positive message for Rowf. The Tod is overtaken and killed by the hounds. The Tod's death is not explicitly depicted, although one of the huntsmen is described as holding up his body and tossing it to the hounds.

Digby Driver: A newspaper reporter for the fictional London Orator. He is an amoral, self-centred man, writing wildly sensationalist articles with only the sketchiest grounding in fact and using blackmail to extort background information about bio-weapon research at ARSE. The media hysteria he creates causes panic among the local populace and eventually moves the government to deploy the army to exterminate the dogs. He redeems himself when he receives a letter from Snitter's hospitalized master and brings him from the hospital to the centre of the action in the nick of time to meet the boat returning the dogs to land and assert his legal claim as Snitter's owner, thus saving Snitter (and incidentally Rowf as well) from summary execution by the waiting soldiers. In the film, he is depicted instead as a woman television reporter named "Lynn Driver".

Dr. Boycott: A senior researcher at ARSE who was in charge of the experimental programme which involved Rowf. He is callous and unfeeling, with no sympathy for either the animals in his experiments or his subordinate, Stephen Powell. His inept handling of the situation arising from the dogs' escape serves both to antagonize the local farmers, who are losing sheep to the dogs, and to provide grist to Digby Driver's mill despite his efforts to do the opposite.

Stephen Powell: Dr. Boycott's subordinate, somewhat nervous and fearful of his chief, and evidently possessed of sympathy for his experimental charges which he dares not express for fear of being regarded as an unsound scientist by Dr. Boycott. It appears that his original motivation for working in an area which he evidently finds uncomfortable was to help find a cure for the mysterious disease from which his daughter Stephanie is slowly dying, but he has ended up being assigned to totally unrelated research and his main motivation now is simply to maintain a stable home in an area where his daughter is happy (i.e., the Lake District). Eventually his conscience gets the better of him during a pointless sensory deprivation experiment on a monkey. He steals the monkey and takes it home, quits his job, and plans to get local employment as "a teacher or something." Early in the story he is given a lift by Digby Driver and, not realizing that he is a reporter, chats freely about his work in response to Driver's questioning. The repercussions of this inadvertent leak are another factor in his decision to quit his job.

Dr. Goodner: A researcher at ARSE carrying out secret bio-weapon research for the Ministry of Defence. He is German by birth and was a "researcher" in Buchenwald during the Second World War, but has managed to conceal this information. Digby Driver finds out about Goodner's past through contacts at the Orator and uses the information to blackmail him into revealing details of his research, specifically that he was researching the bubonic plague, which Driver uses as the foundation of his sensationalist scaremongering. The name "Goodner" is at one point revealed to be an anglicized form of "Geutner" – which is also the surname of the main female character in the original version of Adams's next novel The Girl in a Swing.

Harry Tyson: The odd-job man at ARSE, in charge of feeding and cleaning the animals and general care-taking duties. It is his neglecting to close Rowf's cage properly that allows the dogs to escape, but he successfully conceals his mistake by sabotaging the catch of the cage before anyone notices the missing animals.

Geoffrey Westcott: A local bank clerk who is something of a recluse, disdaining human relationships in favor of accumulating finely crafted technological artifacts. While returning from a grocery shopping trip with his landlady in his Volvo P1800, he stops for toilet purposes, and while both humans are out of the car the dogs suddenly appear, invade the car and devour all the shopping. His anger at the violation of his prized car leads him on a solitary one-man crusade to destroy the dogs, and he falls to his death from the top of Dow Crag while attempting a difficult shot at Rowf, whom he had spotted on the screes below. The dogs are by now starving, snowfall having removed the sheep from the fells and cut off their main food source, and they devour Westcott's body. The discovery of the mutilated corpse allows Digby Driver to whip up media hysteria to new heights. His role of falling off a cliff in the film was taken by a bounty hunter named Ackland, who was hired by Dr. Boycott to take out the dogs.

David Ephraim: A Jewish businessman who organizes a hunt for the dogs. It is implied he is a Holocaust survivor, and suffers from frequent bouts of depression. He encounters Snitter by himself during the hunt, and although he prepares to shoot him, he notices the surgical scar on the dog's head and is moved to tears because it is implied that it reminds him of the medical experiments conducted at Auschwitz. Setting his gun aside, he tries to get Snitter to come get into his car. But when Snitter excitedly jumps up into his arms, his toe catches the trigger of Ephraim's shotgun. Because Ephraim had taken the safety catch off upon seeing Snitter, and forgotten to put it back on when setting the weapon aside, Snitter's toe catching the trigger causes the gun to off in Ephraim's face, killing him instantly. Snitter is traumatized by the incident, and Ephraim's death catches the attention of the media, who run with the story of the "dog who shot a man." He was renamed as "Pierce Chetwind" in the film.

Alan Wood: Snitter's master. He is a gentle, kindly man, in late middle age, working as a solicitor. He is somewhat untidy in matters of housekeeping, which he deems unimportant, and seems to have little social life, but is devoted to Snitter. For most of the book, Snitter believes him to be dead — killed in an accident as he saved Snitter from being run over by a truck after the dog ran onto the road. Snitter reminisces fondly and wistfully about his life with his master, gradually working up to the traumatic events of the accident, wracked by guilt because he believes himself responsible for his master's death. Near the end of the story, it is revealed that Wood survived the accident and is recovering slowly in a hospital. He had been told by his sister that Snitter has run off and cannot be found; he is horrified when he eventually sees a report in the Orator and realizes the truth. He writes to Digby Driver, who (in a fit of character reversal) is overcome with guilt for his actions, and takes him from the hospital to the scene of the action just in time to ensure a happy ending, asserting his legal claim as Snitter's owner and taking in Rowf as well.

Ann Moss: Alan Wood's sister, referred to by him, and therefore Snitter also, as Mrs. Annie Mossity — a pun on  "animosity". She is a domineering woman, and it is implied that her husband ran off without the formalities of a divorce because he could not stand her any more. She is disdainful of her brother's easygoing, untidy ways and has hated Snitter since she first met him. To her falls the responsibility of looking after Snitter after Wood's road accident, which she discharges by selling him to ARSE, buying fur-lined boots and gloves with the proceeds, and lying to Alan to cover her misdeeds. She is interviewed by Digby Driver midway through the book, and is successful in falsely confirming Driver's assumption that her brother is dead. When Driver finds out about the truth, he confronts Moss and interrogates her. Moss reveals her whereabouts and Driver helps Wood find Snitter and Rowf.

William Harbottle: Also known as "Hot Bottle Bill" by his civil servants, is a British Cabinet Minister who works as a Secretary of State of the Department of the Environment. It is implied that he and his civil servants were responsible for having A.R.S.E. set up in Lawson Park. When Rowf and Snitter begin killing sheep, the farmers realize that the dogs were from the lab and figure that if the media can discredit the lab, they can embarrass the Secretary of State. After Snitter accidentally kills Ephraim, the government department sends Digby Driver to investigate, but he blackmails Dr. Goodner to have him publish a headline about the dogs carrying the plague. Harbottle and his civil servants try to address the situation to the public and have sent the military of the 3rd Battalion Parachute to hunt down the dogs. When the dogs were rescued and reunited with Alan Wood, Harbottle and his senior civil servant, the Under Secretary, arrive to have the dogs shot, but the warden of the Drigg Nature reserve forces him to leave, telling him that he has no right to be there and that it's illegal to bring guns into the nature reserve.

Under Secretary: Harbottle's senior civil servant who was responsible for having A.R.S.E. set up in Lawson Park. When he and Harbottle prepare to have the dogs shot after they were rescued from sea, the warden of the Drigg Nature Reserve and Digby Driver confront them and force them to leave as Rowf chases them away.

Kiff: Rowf and Snitter's former friend who was mentioned several times throughout the book. It is stated that he had black and white fur and was a friend of Rowf and Snitter. Unfortunately, he was taken away by the scientists and was sentenced to death by cumulative electrocution.

Adaptations
Like its predecessor Watership Down, Martin Rosen directed and adapted The Plague Dogs into an animated feature film, which was released in 1982. Unlike the book, there is the implication that the Tod might still be alive in the movie; a hunter who found him says he and the others "caught" a fox, this could imply the Tod is merely playing dead. In contrast to the ending in all published editions of the book—which describes the dogs being rescued from the sea, cleared of carrying the plague, and united with Snitter's lost master—the film ends the way Adams first envisioned (before being prevailed upon by his editor and others who read his original manuscript), with the dogs swimming out to sea, hoping to find what Snitter calls "The Isle Of Dog" in the novel (though Rowf grimly speculates that it's probably the Isle of Man). After swimming for a while, Snitter eventually comes to the conclusion that he imagined the island. As he is about to give up and drown, Rowf claims to directly see the island and they struggle on. It then ends with them disappearing into the mist, supposedly heading to the island. In the film's credits an island can be seen in the distance, seemingly confirming that it is real.

References

1977 British novels
1977 science fiction novels
Books about animal testing
Books about foxes
British adventure novels
British novels adapted into films
British science fiction novels
Fiction about animal cruelty
Literature featuring anthropomorphic foxes
Metafictional novels
Novels about dogs
Novels by Richard Adams
Novels set in the Lake District
Allen Lane (imprint) books